Abronia gadovii, also known as Gadow's alligator lizard, is a species of lizard in the family Anguidae. The species is endemic to the highlands of the Sierra Madre del Sur in Guerrero and Oaxaca, Mexico.

Two subspecies are recognized:
 – Oaxaca

References

Abronia
Lizards of North America
Endemic reptiles of Mexico
Reptiles described in 1913
Taxa named by George Albert Boulenger